Tsvetopol is a rural locality (a selo) in Mikhaylovsky Selsoviet, Burlinsky District, Altai Krai, Russia. The population was 212 as of 2013. There are 2 streets.

Geography 
Tsvetopol is located 20 km southwest of Burla (the district's administrative centre) by road. Orekhovo and Chernavka are the nearest rural localities.

References 

Rural localities in Burlinsky District